Pierfrancesco Favino (August 24, 1969) is an Italian actor, voice actor and producer. He has appeared in more than fifty European and American movies and television series since the early 1990s, including The Prince of Homburg (1997), The Last Kiss (2001), El Alamein: The Line of Fire (2002), The Keys to the House (2004), Romanzo Criminale (2005), The Unknown Woman (2006), Night at the Museum (2006), Saturn in Opposition (2007), The Chronicles of Narnia: Prince Caspian (2008), Angels & Demons (2009), ACAB – All Cops Are Bastards (2012) Piazza Fontana: The Italian Conspiracy (2012), World War Z (2013), Rush (2013), Suburra (2015) and The Traitor (2019). In 2020, he won the Volpi Cup at Venice Film Festival for his performance in Padrenostro.

Life and career
Favino was born in Rome, Italy, to Apulian parents from Candela, a comune in the province of Foggia. He has appeared in more than 40 European films and television series since the early 1990s, including Paolo Poeti's Amico mio, Gabriele Muccino's The Last Kiss, Gianni Amelio's The Keys to the House, Giuseppe Tornatore's The Unknown Woman and Ferzan Özpetek's Saturn in Opposition. In 1999 he starred in the HBO film Excellent Cadavers, an adaptation of Alexander Stille's novel of the same name. In 2006 he received the David di Donatello award - the Italian equivalent of the Oscar - for his role in the crime film Romanzo Criminale, directed by Michele Placido.

In 2006 he portrayed Christopher Columbus in Twentieth Century Fox's Night at the Museum. In 2008 he played General Glozelle, the leader of Miraz's Telmarine troops in The Chronicles of Narnia: Prince Caspian. He has worked with American director Ron Howard twice: in the 2009 film Angels & Demons, the adaptation of the novel of the same name by Dan Brown, in which he played the role of Inspector Ernesto Olivetti, and in the 2013 film Rush, in which he played the role of Formula One racing car driver Clay Regazzoni.

Other significant roles include the partisan leader Peppi Grotta in Spike Lee's Miracle at St. Anna in 2008, the sadistic riot control force policeman Cobra in Stefano Sollima's ACAB – All Cops Are Bastards in 2012, the anarchist Giuseppe Pinelli in Marco Tullio Giordana's Piazza Fontana, and the W.H.O. doctor in Marc Forster's apocalyptic-horror World War Z (2013).

In February 2018, he co-hosted the 68th edition of the Sanremo Music Festival, alongside Claudio Baglioni and Michelle Hunziker.

Personal life 
Favino has been in a relationship with Italian actress Anna Ferzetti since 2003. The couple have two daughters together, one born in 2006 and the other born in 2012.

Filmography

Film

Television

References

External links

1969 births
Living people
Italian male actors
People of Apulian descent
Accademia Nazionale di Arte Drammatica Silvio D'Amico alumni
David di Donatello winners
Nastro d'Argento winners
Volpi Cup for Best Actor winners